Monteithiana is a genus of flies belonging to the family Lesser Dung flies.

Species
M. cynthia Richards, 1973
M. dealata Richards, 1973

References

Sphaeroceridae
Diptera of Australasia
Brachycera genera